In geometry, a half-space is either of the two parts into which a plane divides the three-dimensional Euclidean space. 
If the space is two-dimensional, then a half-space is called a half-plane (open or closed). A half-space in a one-dimensional space is called a half-line or ray.

More generally, a half-space is either of the two parts into which a hyperplane divides an affine space. That is, the points that are not incident to the hyperplane are partitioned into two convex sets (i.e., half-spaces), such that any subspace connecting a point in one set to a point in the other must intersect the hyperplane.

A half-space can be either open or closed. An open half-space is either of the two open sets produced by the subtraction of a hyperplane from the affine space. A closed half-space is the union of an open half-space and the hyperplane that defines it.

The open (closed) upper half-space is the half-space of all (x1, x2, ..., xn) such that xn > 0 (≥ 0). The open (closed) lower half-space is defined similarly, by requiring that xn be negative (non-positive).

A half-space may be specified by a linear inequality, derived from the linear equation that specifies the defining hyperplane.
A strict linear inequality specifies an open half-space:

A non-strict one specifies a closed half-space:

Here, one assumes that not all of the real numbers a1, a2, ..., an are zero.

A half-space is a convex set.

See also
 Line (geometry)
 Poincaré half-plane model
 Siegel upper half-space
 Nef polygon, construction of polyhedra using half-spaces.

External links
 
 

Euclidean geometry